Pedro Calderón de la Barca was a Spanish Golden Age playwright who — from the beginning of his theatrical career in the 1620s to his death in 1681 — wrote about 120 comedias and about 80 autos sacramentales. About 40 of these have been translated into English, at least three during Calderón's own lifetime; La vida es sueño (Life is a Dream), "a work many hold to be the supreme example of Spanish Golden Age drama", exists in around 20 English versions.

Early trends in translation

1600s and 1700s: cape and sword

Calderón evidently exerted no direct influence on English playwrights before 1660, although one play by John Fletcher and one by Philip Massinger are probably based to some extent on Spanish originals, and James Shirley's The Young Admiral and The Opportunity are adaptations of plays by Calderón's contemporaries Lope de Vega and Tirso de Molina respectively.

The wild success of Sir Samuel Tuke's The Adventures of Five Hours, a 1663 adaptation of a play by Spanish playwright Antonio Coello, began a fashion for Spanish adaptations on the English Restoration stage. Within 4 years, George Digby had translated 3 comedies by Calderón. After this "bubble" based on Calderón's reputation as a popular playwright, his direct influence vanishes almost entirely from the English stage for over a century.

1800s: the Spanish Shakespeare

At the beginning of the 19th century, international interest in Calderón was resurrected by August Schlegel, and English translation resumed. Now, Calderón was more often seen as a philosophical, literary, or religious — rather than a popular — dramatist. The two giants of 19th-century Calderón translation exhibit opposing approaches to the "Spanish Shakepeare". Edward Fitzgerald, turning Calderón into a pseudo-Elizabethan, states:

I do not believe an exact translation of this poet can be very successful… I have, while faithfully trying to retain what was fine and efficient, sunk, reduced, altered, and replaced, much that seemed not…

Denis Florence MacCarthy exhibiting a more formal "bardolotry" writes:

All the forms of verse have been preserved; while the closeness of the translation may be inferred from the fact, that not only the whole play but every speech and fragment of a speech are represented in English in the exact number of lines of the original, without the sacrifice, it is to be hoped, of one important idea.

It might be said that Fitzgerald's translations were quite English, but not Calderón; while Mac-Carthy's were Calderón, but not quite English.

Other echoes
Besides full translations, Calderón's plays have provided, as it were, raw materials for some English plays (not included in the table below).

Though the ultimate source of John Dryden's An Evening's Love; or, The Mock Astrologer (1668) is Calderón's El Astrologo Fingido, scholars have not determined how much of his writing (if any) is based directly on Calderón, how much on Thomas Corneille's Le Feint Astrologue (a French translation of Calderón's work, which Dryden also acknowledges as a source), and how much on any of several other related French and English sources; whatever the sources, he used them freely, and his entire fifth act is original.

The "high" plot (one of several) in William Wycherley's Love in a Wood (1672) is based on Mañanas de abril y mayo (Mornings of April and May). The basic idea (though not particular scenes) of his Gentleman Dancing-Master (1673) hails from Calderón's El maestro de Danzar. Isaac Bickerstaff writes in 1770 that:

Calderon ... through Molière, Corneille, Le Sage, Boissy, etc. has provided Vanbrugh, Centlivre, Cibber, and Steel, with The Mistake, The False Friend, The Wonder, The Busy Body, The Kind Impostor, The Lady's Philosophy, and The Lying Lover, all English Comedies, which have been received upon the stage with the warmest marks of approbation.

Similarly, John Howard Payne's The Last Duel in Spain (apparently from about 1822-30, and unproduced), although based ultimately on Calderón's El Postrer Duelo de España was probably actually derived from D'Esménard's French prose translation, Le Dernier Duel en Espagne, published in 1822.

Translations

Key

 Spanish Title — The original comedia or auto that serves as the basis of the English text.
 English Title — The title of the English text, as it appears in the particular translation. Because one Spanish title may suggest alternate English titles (e.g. Life is a Dream, Life's a Dream, Such Stuff as Dreams are Made Of), sorting by this column is not a reliable way to group all translations of a particular original together; to do so, sort on Spanish Title.
 Year — The year of the translation's first publication (except where * indicates "first production"). Some translations were written or produced earlier than this date, and some were republished subsequently, but this is not noted here.
 Publication — The publication in which the translation first appeared. When the publication consisted only of the single named play this information is not repeated, except in cases where the publication title is used as an external link to the work, or when it is matched with an ISBN.
 Notes — May indicate the style of translation or significant republications; "auto" indicates an auto sacramentale; all other works are comedias.

Table

Notes

References

External links
Online bibliography
 A Bibliography Of Spanish Comedias In English Translation
Additional translated texts available online
 AHCT Spanish Comedias in English Translation
 Calderón at Project Gutenberg

17th-century plays
Plays by Pedro Calderón de la Barca
Translations into English
Lists of plays
Translation-related lists